Pinas is a commune of the Hautes-Pyrénées département in southwestern France.

Pinas or Piñas may also refer to:

Places
 Pinas (country), a contraction of Pilipinas, the Republic of the Philippines
 Piñas Canton, El Oro Province, Ecuador
 Piñas, Comerío, Puerto Rico, a barrio
 Piñas, Toa Alta, Puerto Rico, a barrio
 Las Piñas, a city in the Philippines

Other uses
 Pinas (Philippine newspaper), a newspaper of Metro Manila
 Pinas (ship), a type of Malaysian sailing vessel
 Pinas FM 95.5, an FM radio station in the Philippines
 Brian Pinas (born 1978), Dutch football player

See also
 Pina (disambiguation)
 Piña (disambiguation)